Coonawarra is a south-eastern suburb in the city of Darwin, in the Northern Territory of Australia.

Defence Establishment Berrimah and the Northern Immigration Detention Centre are located in Coonawarra. 

The suburb's name is derived from HMAS Coonawarra, a naval establishment which was located in the suburb until 2003.  'Coonawarra' itself is an Aboriginal word which means "swan".

References 

Suburbs of Darwin, Northern Territory